Benjamin Patterson Inn, also known as Jenning's Tavern, is a historic inn and tavern located in Corning in Steuben County, New York. It is a two-story, ell shaped frame structure in the Federal style.  Built in 1796, it is the oldest frame building in the area and perhaps all of Steuben County.

It was listed on the National Register of Historic Places in 1973.

The Benjamin Patterson Inn is a historic house operated as part of the Heritage Village of the Southern Finger Lakes by the Corning Painted Post Historical Society. Visitors can tour the historic tavern room, dining room, kitchen, guest quarters and innkeeper's quarters, and view the Society's collection of textile equipment in the Long Room.  The Inn grounds also include an 1855 log cabin, an 1878 schoolhouse, a barn with agriculture tools and equipment and a working late 19th-century blacksmith shop.

The Society also operates the Painted Post-Erwin Museum, a museum of local history located in a late 19th-century railroad depot in Painted Post, New York.

References

External links
 
 Heritage Village of the Southern Finger Lakes - run by the Corning-Painted Post Historical Society (Retrieved 15 April 2015)

Drinking establishments on the National Register of Historic Places in New York (state)
Federal architecture in New York (state)
Hotel buildings completed in 1796
Buildings and structures in Steuben County, New York
Taverns in New York (state)
Corning, New York
Museums in Steuben County, New York
Historic house museums in New York (state)
National Register of Historic Places in Steuben County, New York
Taverns on the National Register of Historic Places in New York (state)
1796 establishments in New York (state)